Marek Priechodský (born October 24, 1979) is a Slovak former professional ice hockey player who played with HC Slovan Bratislava in the Slovak Extraliga.

He also played for HKm Zvolen, MHC Martin, KHL Medveščak in Croatia and Podhale Nowy Targ in Poland. In 2010, he moved to the Netherlands.

Career statistics

Regular season and playoffs

International

References

External links

1979 births
Living people
HC '05 Banská Bystrica players
Chamonix HC players
HC 07 Detva players
Kemphanen Eindhoven players
MHC Martin players
KHL Medveščak Zagreb players
Pensacola Ice Pilots players
Podhale Nowy Targ players
HK 36 Skalica players
Slovak ice hockey defencemen
HC Slovan Bratislava players
HK Spišská Nová Ves players
Ice hockey people from Bratislava
Tampa Bay Lightning draft picks
MsHK Žilina players
HKM Zvolen players
Slovak expatriate ice hockey players in the United States
Slovak expatriate sportspeople in Poland
Slovak expatriate sportspeople in France
Slovak expatriate sportspeople in the Netherlands
Slovak expatriate sportspeople in Croatia
Expatriate ice hockey players in the Netherlands
Expatriate ice hockey players in Poland
Expatriate ice hockey players in Croatia
Expatriate ice hockey players in France